Canback Consulting (an independent business unit of Economist Group) was a global management consulting firm headquartered in Cambridge, Massachusetts, United States. The firm provided advisory services for senior management of global corporations.

Practices were strategy, M&A due diligence, sources of growth, corporate finance, and organizational performance.

History
Canback was founded in 2004 under the name Canback Dangel by Dr. Staffan Canback, a Harvard Business School alumnus and former partner at McKinsey & Co. and Monitor Company; and Justin Dangel, a venture capitalist and entrepreneur
The name was later changed to Canback Consulting. The firm was acquired by The Economist Group through its Economist Intelligence Unit subsidiary in July 2015. The firm closed down its operations in July 2020.

Services and clients
Canback offered management consulting to global companies and private equity firms. The firm had five practices: Strategy, M&A Due Diligence, Sources of Growth, Corporate Finance, and Organizational Performance.

Clients were global companies mainly within sectors: Consumer Goods, Retail, Cellular services, and Financial Services.

Geographies
Canback Consulting had since its founding worked on the ground in 89 countries. A particular expertise was emerging countries.

Recruiting
Canback employees were mainly recruited directly from premier universities including Harvard, MIT, Yale, Tufts, Dartmouth, University of Cape Town, and Boston University. The firm favorsed candidates with exceptional quantitative skills.

References

Companies based in Boston
Consulting firms established in 2004
International management consulting firms
Management consulting firms of the United States